José María Gisbert Ortiga (born 7 February 1945) is a retired amateur and professional tennis player from the 1960s. He is a brother of Juan Gisbert Sr. and Jorge Gisbert.

He played in a Davis Cup tie for Spain in 1969 and won the only match he played, which was a dead rubber.

References

1945 births
Living people
Tennis players from Catalonia
Spanish male tennis players
Tennis players from Barcelona
Universiade medalists in tennis
Universiade gold medalists for Spain
Medalists at the 1967 Summer Universiade